Icapuí is the easternmost municipality in the Brazilian state of Ceará, located in the northeast coast of the state. Known for being the first city in Brazil to perform the eradication of illiteracy.

References 

Populated places established in 1984
Populated coastal places in Ceará
Municipalities in Ceará